Tachina discifera is a species of fly in the genus Tachina of the family Tachinidae that is endemic to Maluku province of  Indonesia.

References

Insects described in 1860
Diptera of Asia
Endemic fauna of Indonesia
discifera